This is a list of fictional settlements, including fictional towns, villages and cities, organized by each city's medium. This list should include only well-referenced, notable examples of fictional towns, cities, settlements and villages that are integral to a work of fiction and substantively depicted therein. Fictional cities, towns and counties are arrows in the fiction writers' quivers  they lend an air of authenticity to the story, and since there are so many of them, readers find them to be a plausible addition that makes the story more realistic.

Comics

Film

Television

Radio

Animated

Literature

Video games

Mythology

Other

See also

 Fictional city
 Welcome to Night Vale
 List of fictional British and Irish universities

References

 
Towns